The Morlocks and Other Pieces is an album by Alexander von Schlippenbach and the Berlin Contemporary Jazz Orchestra. It was recorded in July 1993 at RIAS Studio 10 in Berlin, and was released in 1994 by FMP. It features six compositions by Schlippenbach with dates ranging from 1983 to 1993.

Reception

In a review for AllMusic, Thom Jurek wrote: "With ten years between the earliest and latest compositions here, one can imagine how varied the program is... it's a wonderful collection of modern music that showcases even further the vast range of musical languages that von Schlippenbach has at his disposal."

The authors of the Penguin Guide to Jazz Recordings stated: "This record establishes Schlippenbach much more clearly as a composer. It is worth comparing its language to that of the London Jazz Composers' Orchestra under Barry Guy, which is simultaneously more abstract but also more orthdoxly jazz-centred."

Track listing
All compositions by Alexander von Schlippenbach.

 "Any Piece, But A's Piece (1993)" – 10:28
 "Contrareflection (1989)" – 7:06
 "Rigaudon Nr. 2 Aus Der Wasserstoffmusik (1987)" – 12:03
 "Marcia Di Saturno (1984)" – 12:54
 "The Morlocks (1993)" – 16:00
 "Jackhammer (1983)" – 10:32

Personnel 

 Alexander von Schlippenbach – piano, conductor
 Darcy Hepner – alto saxophone
 Claas Willecke – flute, baritone saxophone
 Tilman Denhard – flute, piccolo, tenor saxophone
 Walter Gauchel – tenor saxophone
 Evan Parker – tenor saxophone, soprano saxophone
 Axel Dörner – trumpet
 Henry Lowther – trumpet
 Thomas Heberer – trumpet
 Jörg Huke – trombone
 Marc Boukouya – trombone
 Sören Fischer – trombone
 Utz Zimmermann – trombone
 Aki Takase – piano, conductor
 Nobuyoshi Ino – double bass
 Paul Lovens – percussion

References

 Berlin Contemporary Jazz Orchestra albums
1994 albums
Big band albums
Jazz albums
FMP/Free Music Production albums